was a Japanese martial artist and founder of Japanese yoga. He was the first to bring yoga to Japan and founded his own art called , and taught it at Tempu-Kai that he established.

Biography

Early life and family background
Born in Tokyo, Japan, his original name was Saburō.  He was the son of Sukeoki Nakamura (中村祐興 1829-1909) of Fukuoka Prefecture and Teu Nakamura (中村テウ 1858-1928) of Tokyo, known as Edo at the time. His father introduced the use of paper money in Japan when he served as the bureau director of the Japanese Ministry of Finance.  Tempū Nakamura later moved to Fukuoka (福岡市, Fukuoka City), Fukuoka Prefecture (福岡県), to live with a relative.  Once there, he took private lessons from an Englishman and enrolled in the Shūyūkan (now Fukuoka Prefectural Shuyukan Senior High School in Sawara-ku) school where English was the medium of instruction and where he became proficient in his family's style of judo (随変流) and also trained in kenjutsu and iaijutsu. During judo practice, he totally defeated an opponent from Kumamoto who then tried to kill Nakamura in revenge. In the violent encounter, Nakamura stabbed and killed his assailant, which was ruled legitimate self-defence. He left the school and joined Gen'yōsha ultra-nationalist secret society, forming a friendship with Tōyama Mitsuru.

In the Imperial Japanese military

At the age of 16, he joined the Imperial Japanese Army and served as a covert agent in Northern China. China was reigned by the Manchu dynasty at that time. He was one of only nine out of 113 military affairs investigators to return to Japan alive from the Russo-Japanese War, after which he suffered a severe attack of tuberculosis at the age of 30.

Seeking a cure for his illness
Seeking a cure for the illness, he studied the autonomic nerves at Columbia University, and traveled to England, Germany, Belgium and France. For a period of time he lived with the family of Sarah Bernhardt. In 1911, on his way back to Japan, he met an Indian yogi in Egypt named Kaliapa (a.k.a. Cariapa and Kariappa), who took him to Gorkhe, in eastern Nepal. He remained there for two and a half years of yoga study and practice, during which time his illness was cured. He practiced a variation of Raja Yoga and Karma Yoga with Kaliapa, with an emphasis on Raja Yoga.

Return to Japan

After finally returning to Japan, he served as president of Tokyo Industrial Bank, among other business activities. He established his own medical and philosophical organization in 1919, renaming it Tempūkai in 1940.  He taught Shin Shin Tōitsu-dō to Tōhei Kōichi, who later founded Shinshin-tōitsu-aikidō.

He died in 1968, and was buried in the cemetery attached to Gokoku-ji, Tokyo. In Japan, Tempū is remembered as a prolific writer and a practitioner of philosophy and entrepreneurship.

Tempu-Kai
Tempu-Kai is headquartered in Otsuka (大塚), Bunkyo-ku, Tokyo, and actively holds seminars and retreats to teach his Shinshin-tōitsu-dō. It has branches all over Japan and overseas, such as in Hawaii.

His influence to Japanese leaders
Tempu made considerable influence to the leaders of the Japanese society in various fields. They include: Tōgō Heihachirō, Hara Takashi, Seibo Kitamura, Chiyo Uno, Futabayama Sadaji, Tatsuro Hirooka, Konosuke Matsushita, Kazuo Inamori, et al., and more recently, Shohei Ohtani.

People who studied under Tempu
Uno Chiyo author
Tōgō Heihachirō the 'Admiral Nelson of the East'
Hara Takashi  the 19th Prime Minister of Japan
Matsushita Kōnosuke the founder of Matsushita Electric
Tōhei Kōichi founder of Ki-Aikido
Tada Hiroshi Aikikai Aikido
Ozaki Yukio politician
Inamori Kazuo founder of Kyocera Corporation
Hirooka Tatsurō baseball player

Published works
Published works by Tempū Nakamura include these Japanese titles:
  成功の実現 (The Realisation of Success)
  盛大な人生 (A Prosperous Life)
  心に成功の炎を (Setting Fire to the Heart for Success)
  運命を拓く (Altering Fate)
  叡智のひびき-天風哲人箴言註釈 (Resounding Wisdom - the Annotated Maxims of Philosopher Tempū)
  真理のひびき-天風哲人新箴言註釈 (Resounding Truth - the Annotated Maxims of Philosopher Tempū)
  いつまでも若々しく生きる (Living Youthfully)
  君に成功を贈る (Building Your Success)

References

 Seitai Kyokai translation
The Life of Nakamura Tempu article (archived)
Nakamura Tempu and the Origins of Japanese Yoga by H. E. Davey
The Nakamura Tempū Story part I and II

External links
Tempu-Kai (天風会) (in Japanese)
International Japanese Yoga Association  
English-language books on Nakamura Tempu

Japanese yogis
1876 births
1968 deaths
Japanese writers
Columbia University alumni
Yoga teachers